Surahiya is a small village in the Ballia district of Uttar Pradesh, India. It is situated near the town of Sahatwar at a distance of 3 km. The village is known mainly for its contributions to Indian independence, some people of this village are now called freedom fighters. Uttar tola foolwari, paschim tola baswari, and many more attracting sites are in the village. Many people were rewarded by huge land area in Nanital at the time of independence. Ajeet Kumar Singh, Advocate, High Court Allahabad, deals with Criminal and constitutional matters belongs to this village.

Villages in Ballia district